"Take the Skinheads Bowling" is the signature song of Santa Cruz, California alternative rock band Camper Van Beethoven, written by David Lowery and released on their 1985 album Telephone Free Landslide Victory. The song (as covered by the band Teenage Fanclub) was notably featured in the Michael Moore documentary Bowling for Columbine, and received substantial airplay on KROQ and BBC Radio 2 as well as on The Dr. Demento Show. The song was covered by Welsh rock band Manic Street Preachers as a B-side to their 1996 single "Australia" and subsequently included on their B-side compilation album Lipstick Traces (A Secret History of Manic Street Preachers).

Lowery admits to being surprised by the success of "Take the Skinheads Bowling," stating on his blog:

Lyrics 
The lyrics of the song mainly discuss the titular action of "[taking] the skinheads bowling", but there are also some humorous lines relating to bowling alleys ("Some people say that bowling alleys got big lanes") or the song itself ("There's not a line that goes here that rhymes with anything").

Take the Skinheads Bowling EP

Track listing
 "Take the Skinheads Bowling"
 "Cowboys From Hollywood"
 "Epigram"
 "Atkuda"
 "Epigram"
 "Colonel Enrique Adolfo Bermudez"

Charts

References

1985 songs
1986 singles
Ten-pin bowling mass media
I.R.S. Records singles
Camper Van Beethoven songs